Liu Lit-for, MBE, JP (21 September 1930 – 21 September 1998) was the executive director of Liu Chong Hing Bank and member of the Legislative Council of Hong Kong.

Liu was the second son of Liu Po-shan, the founder of the Liu Chong Hing Bank. He was born and studied in mainland China before moving to Hong Kong.

He was appointed to the Central and Western District Board and elected to the Legislative Council in the indirect election in 1985 through West Island electoral college constituency consisting of members of the Central and Western and Southern District Board. He failed to be reelected in 1988.

He was elected as the Hong Kong deputy to the National People's Congress of the People's Republic of China in December 1997, but soon died of a heart attack during a trip to Phuket in 1998.

References

1930 births
1998 deaths
Hong Kong bankers
Members of the Order of the British Empire
District councillors of Central and Western District
Progressive Hong Kong Society politicians
HK LegCo Members 1985–1988
Delegates to the 9th National People's Congress from Hong Kong
Members of the Selection Committee of Hong Kong